Snowhaven is a modest ski area in the western United States, located in north central Idaho, seven miles (11 km) southeast of Grangeville in  The elevation of its summit is  above sea level, with a vertical drop of  on east-facing slopes.

There are two surface lifts, a T-bar and a rope tow, serving 9 trails.

The facility is operated by the City of Grangeville and is open on weekends. Ski operations began around 1940, but it saw little use until after World War II. A new access road was constructed in 1957.

References

External links
Snowhaven
Visit Idaho – Snowhaven
Ski Map.org – trail maps – Snowhaven

Ski areas and resorts in Idaho
Buildings and structures in Idaho County, Idaho
Tourist attractions in Idaho County, Idaho